The men's super heavyweight boxing competition at the 2012 Olympic Games in London was held from 1 to 12 August at the ExCeL Exhibition Centre. Sixteen boxers from different countries competed.

Competition format
The competition consisted of a single-elimination tournament.  Bronze medals were awarded to both semifinal losers.  Bouts were three rounds of three minutes each.

Schedule 
All times are British Summer Time (UTC+1)

Results

References

Boxing at the 2012 Summer Olympics
Men's events at the 2012 Summer Olympics